The Son-Daughter is a 1932 American pre-Code drama film directed by Clarence Brown and written by John F. Goodrich, Claudine West, and Leon Gordon, adapted from the play of the same name by David Belasco. The film stars Helen Hayes, Ramon Novarro, Lewis Stone, Warner Oland, and Ralph Morgan. The film was released on December 23, 1932, by Metro-Goldwyn-Mayer.

Premise
In a story set in San Francisco's Chinatown, Tom Lee, a Chinese prince disguised as student, is in love with Lien Wha during unrest between opposing groups of the Chinese community.

Cast 
Helen Hayes as Lien Wha
Ramon Novarro as Tom Lee
Lewis Stone as Dr. Dong Tong
Warner Oland as Fen Sha
Ralph Morgan as Fang Fou Hy
Louise Closser Hale as Toy Yah
H. B. Warner as Sin Kai

Reception
According to André Soares' biography on Navarro, Beyond Paradise, "[The star] earned only scant good notices when [The Son-Daughter] opened on December 23, 1932"; and despite Navarro's leading man status in Hollywood at the time, "The picture itself received overwhelmingly negative reviews".

References

External links

 

1932 films
American drama films
1932 drama films
Metro-Goldwyn-Mayer films
Films directed by Clarence Brown
Films directed by Robert Z. Leonard
Films scored by Herbert Stothart
American black-and-white films
American films based on plays
Films set in San Francisco
1930s English-language films
1930s American films